Biskupice  is a village in the administrative district of Gmina Trawniki, within Świdnik County, Lublin Voivodeship, in eastern Poland.

In 1921, there was a Jewish population of 129 people. During the Holocaust, the town's Jewish population suffered tremendously. A group of 120 to 200 Jews from Kraków, Poland were sent to Biskupice, Lublin district. In February 1942 a transport of 600 Jews was directed to the Bełżec extermination camp. Other Jews in the ghetto apparently were sent to Majdanek. The Jewish community ceased to exist after March 1942.

The village has a current population of 890.

References

Biskupice